Bezzina is a Maltese surname. Most people bearing the surname were descendants of the Emirs of Sicily and Malta. Another branch descended from Giuseppe de Bezzina, a former slave, and his slave wife, Gioannella de Bartolo around 1570. Their descendants are from the Maltese villages of Għargħur, Mġarr, Mosta and Naxxar.

Notable people with the surname include:

 Charlie Bezzina, Australian former Detective Senior Sergeant (Victoria Police) and author
 Dominic Bezzina (18th/19th centuries), Maltese philosopher
 Emmy Bezzina (born 1945), Maltese politician
 Gianluca Bezzina (born 1989), Maltese doctor and pop singer
 Gilbert Bezzina, French violinist and conductor
 Johann Bezzina (born 1994), Maltese footballer
 Lawrence Attard Bezzina, Maltese Jew who founded the Malta-Israel Cultural & Friendship Society
 Marcon Bezzina (born 1985), Maltese judoka
 Steve Bezzina (born 1987), Maltese footballer

See also
 Bezzina (fly), genus of fruit fly named after entomologist Munro Bezzina

References

fr:Bezzina (homonymie)